An arrival card, also known as an incoming passenger card, landing card or disembarkation card, is a legal document used by immigration authorities  of many countries to obtain information about incoming passenger not provided by the passenger's passport (such as health, criminal record, where they will be staying, purpose of the visit, etc.) and to provide a record of a person's entry into the country.  
The card may also provide information on health and character requirements for non-citizens entering the country.  Some countries require an arrival card for each incoming passenger, while others require one card per family unit, and some only require an arrival card for non-citizens only.

Some countries, such as Singapore and Thailand, attach a departure card to the arrival card, which is retained in the alien's passport until their eventual departure. This arrival card can also be combined with a customs declaration, which some countries require incoming passengers to fill out separately.

Some countries, such as Malaysia, do not require an arrival or departure card. The procedure of compiling information from immigration cards is no longer required by United States authorities following the introduction of the biometric recording system by the United States Customs and Border Protection. There is minimal cross-border formality between a number of countries, most notably those in the passport-free travel area of Europe's Schengen Zone. 

The requirement to produce an arrival card is usually in addition to a requirement to produce a passport or other travel document, to obtain a visa, and sometimes complete a customs declaration.

Information on the card itself
The information requested varies by country. Typically the type of information requested on the arrival card includes:
 Full name
 Nationality
 Date of birth
 Passport number, place of issuance and expiration date
 Flight number or name of aircraft, ship or vehicle
 Purpose of trip: vacation, education/study, visiting relatives/families, business, diplomatic
 Duration of stay
 Destination (next stop of disembarkation)
 Address in country
 Information on items being bought into the country which may be of interest to customs and quarantine authorities

Travellers are generally required to sign, date, and declare the information is true, correct, and complete.

United Kingdom 
Non-EEA citizens were formerly required to complete a landing card on entry to the United Kingdom. The traveller was required to present the completed form at the Border Force desk at the point of entry. The form was usually supplied by the airline, train or ferry company.

In the UK, the landing card system was governed by the Immigration Act 1971, schedule 2 paragraph 5, which states;

In August 2017, the UK Home Office announced that landing cards will be completely scrapped as part of digital border transformation and modernisation. It was expected this change would come into effect by the autumn. Landing cards were abolished for all passengers effective 20 May 2019.

Notably absent from the landing card was information on the purpose of the trip, destination, or any items brought into the country. Additional information requested from travellers was their occupation and the port of their last departure.

See also

Airport check-in
Airline ticket
Boarding pass
Departure card
Passport
Visa
Migration card
Immigration Act 1971
Visa policy of the United Kingdom

References

Civil aviation
Identity documents